Juan B. Aquino (1942–1993), also called Shaking Eagle Tail, was a Pueblo-American painter from the Ohkay Owingeh (San Juan) Pueblo. He was educated at Bacone College and exhibited his work across the country. Aquino sold his works, including paintings, woodcarvings, and corn cob dolls, under the moniker Aquino's Indian Arts and Crafts. Some of his works are in the permanent collection of institutions including the Museum of New Mexico.

References 

20th-century American painters
20th-century indigenous painters of the Americas
Native American painters
Pueblo artists
Painters from New Mexico
1942 births
1993 deaths
Bacone College alumni
20th-century Native Americans